We Had It All is the tenth studio album by the American solo artist Scott Walker. It was released in August 1974 but was unsuccessful on the music charts. It was Walker's final solo album for ten years; in the interim Walker reformed The Walker Brothers.

Four of the 10 songs on the album were written by Billy Joe Shaver and had previously appeared on Waylon Jennings's 1973 outlaw country album Honky Tonk Heroes, as had the title track. The album was recorded in August 1974 at Nova Studios, Marble Arch, London. The album was released as an LP in late 1974 and received generally negative reviews. The album was reissued and released on CD in 1997 by BGO Records coupled with Walker's ninth studio album 1973's Stretch. The artwork for the album was produced by Roslav Szaybo with photography from M. Joseph.

Track listing

Release details

References

Scott Walker (singer) albums
1974 albums
Columbia Records albums
Albums produced by Del Newman